The 2009 Arkansas State Red Wolves football team represented Arkansas State University as a member of the Sun Belt Conference during the 2009 NCAA Division I FBS football season. Led by eighth-year head coach Steve Roberts, the Red Wolves compiled an overall record of 4–8 with a mark of 3–5 in conference play, tying for sixth place in the Sun Belt. Arkansas State played home games at ASU Stadium in Jonesboro, Arkansas

Schedule

References

Arkansas State
Arkansas State Red Wolves football seasons
Arkansas State Red Wolves football